The Men's 1 km time trial, Classes 4-5 track cycling event at the 2012 Summer Paralympics took place on 31 August at London Velopark.

Results
WR = World Record, DNF = Did Not Finish

References

Men's time trial C4-5